Elizabeth "Lizzi" Smith (born 26 June 1996) is an American Paralympic swimmer who competes in international level events. She was born without a left forearm due to amniotic band syndrome.

Career
On April 14, 2022, Smith was named to the roster to represent the United States at the 2022 World Para Swimming Championships.

References

1996 births
Living people
Sportspeople from Muncie, Indiana
Sportspeople from Austin, Texas
Paralympic swimmers of the United States
Swimmers at the 2016 Summer Paralympics
Swimmers at the 2020 Summer Paralympics
Medalists at the 2016 Summer Paralympics
Medalists at the 2020 Summer Paralympics
Medalists at the World Para Swimming Championships
Paralympic medalists in swimming
Paralympic silver medalists for the United States
Paralympic bronze medalists for the United States
Medalists at the 2019 Parapan American Games
DeVry University alumni
American female backstroke swimmers
American female butterfly swimmers
American female freestyle swimmers
S9-classified Paralympic swimmers
21st-century American women